Eban is both a given name and a surname. Notable people with the name include:

Surname
Abba Eban (1915–2002), Israeli diplomat and politician, and a scholar of the Arabic and Hebrew languages.
Eli Eban,  Israeli-American clarinetist
Katherine Eban,  American investigative journalist and author

Given name
Eban Hyams, Australian basketball player
Eban Goodstein (born 1960), economist, author, and public educator

Fictional characters
A protagonist from a 2000 film Eban and Charley

See also

Eben